Osvaldo da Silva (13 March 1934 – 15 August 2002) was a Brazilian footballer.

Career statistics

Club

Notes

References

1934 births
2002 deaths
Brazilian footballers
Brazilian expatriate footballers
Association football defenders
Primeira Liga players
América Futebol Clube (MG) players
FC Porto players
Leixões S.C. players
Sporting CP footballers
Associação Portuguesa de Desportos players
Académico de Viseu F.C. players
S.C. Olhanense players
Brazilian expatriate sportspeople in Portugal
Expatriate footballers in Portugal
Footballers from Belo Horizonte